Badancar is a village in the Oio Region of northern Guinea-Bissau. It is located to the south of Dungal, Guinea-Bissau.

References

External links
Maplandia World Gazetteer

Populated places in Guinea-Bissau